Ulrich Lamsfuß (born 1971 in Bonn, West Germany) is an artist based in Berlin.
	
His shows include Somebody Give the Lord a Handclap in Paris, The Raw and The Cooked in New York City, Offensive Malerei in Munich, and The Triumph of Painting at the Saatchi Gallery in London.

Lamsfuß shares the 2005 Contemporary European Painting Award with Frédérique Loutz.

References

 https://query.nytimes.com/gst/fullpage.html?res=9406E1D81E30F93BA15750C0A9659C8B63
 https://www.bloomberg.com/apps/news?pid=20601088&sid=ayJ.qnoehZ5E&refer=home
 http://www.praguebiennale.org/artists/supereal/lasmfuss.php
 https://www.welt.de/print-welt/article362751/Kaleidoskop.html 

1971 births
Living people
20th-century German painters
20th-century German male artists
German male painters
21st-century German painters
21st-century German male artists